Sherston may refer to:

 Sherston, Wiltshire, a village in England
 Sherston Software, publisher of educational games
 The Sherston trilogy, a series of books by Siegfried Sassoon